This is a list of museums in Yemen.

 House of Folklore
 National Museum of Yemen
 Yemen Military Museum

See also

List of museums
Culture of Yemen

References

Museums
 
Yemen
Museums
Museums
Yemen